Khamphoumy Hanvilay (born 2 December 1990) is a Laotian football player who plays for Yotha. He is a member of Laos national football team.

References

External links
 

1990 births
Living people
Laotian footballers
Laos international footballers
Association football defenders
Yotha F.C. players
People from Salavan province